Olearia laciniifolia is a species of flowering plant in the family Asteraceae and is endemic to inland areas of the south-west of Western Australia. It is an erect shrub with scattered oblong leaves with small lobes on the edges, and lilac, white and yellow, daisy-like inflorescences.

Description
The edges of the leaves have small lobes on the edges and the base is wedge-shaped. Flowering occurs from June to November and the fruit is a flattened, pale brown achene, the pappus with about twenty bristles.

Taxonomy
Olearia laciniifolia was first formally described in 1990 by Nicholas Sèan Lander in the journal Nuytsia from specimens collected by Arthur Robert Fairall, near the Newdegate-Lake Grace road in 1964. The specific epithet (laciniifolia) means "flap-leaved", referring to the narrowly-lobed leaves.

Distribution and habitat
Olearia laciniifolia grows in mallee and shrubland around dry lakes in the Coolgardie and Mallee biogeographic regions of inland south-western Western Australia.

Conservation status
This daisy bush is listed as "not threatened" by the Department of Biodiversity, Conservation and Attractions.

References

laciniifolia
Flora of Western Australia
Plants described in 1990